Reeves & Co. was an American farm tractor builder for thirty years, based in Columbus, Indiana.  It built some of the largest steam traction engines used in North America.

Hoosier Boy Cultivator Company
Marshal Reeves was the inventor of a two horse tongueless corn plow in 1869. In 1875 together with his father and uncle formed the Hoosier Boy Cultivator Company. In 1879, the company name was changed to Reeves & Company (abbreviated Reeves & Co.). Reeves went on to design and manufacture threshers, straw stackers, separators, corn shellers and clover
hullers, holding more than 50 patents for the same. 
At the same time as Marshal Reeves' brother Milton began making automobiles, in 1895, Reeves & Co. went into the steam engine business. They made engines in sizes from 13 HP to 40 HP (Nominal Horsepower).

Steam engines
The company built steam plowing engines for the American and Canadian West and provided an engine and boiler approved by Provinces of Alberta and Saskatchewan. These new engines fulfilled these provinces' revised boiler laws enacted in 1910. There, steam breaking plows were needed to till the virgin soil.

The massive 40-120 (and later 140) HP engines were brought out in 1908 and their two stories height allowed the driver (engineer) to see over the cross-compound engine. They built engines in nominal horsepower sizes: 13 hp, 16 hp, 20 hp, 25 hp, 32 hp and 40 hp. The "140" referenced above was the "brake horsepower."

Emerson-Brantingham

Reeves & Company was sold to Emerson-Brantingham on January 1, 1912. Emerson-Brantingham also acquired the Gas Traction Company, Rockford Engine Works, and the Geiser Manufacturing Co.; but by 1915 ran into financial difficulties. After a merger with the former D. M. Osborne company, in 1928 it was bought by J. I. Case Company, now Case Corporation. The company also moved to its present location in Pico Rivera, California and eventually grew to a size of over 170,000 square feet and over 300 employees.

Reeves & Company - clock manufacturer
There was another Reeves & Company in North Carolina and Tennessee which made clocks in the 1820s. These two companies were not related.

See also
List of former tractor manufacturers
List of traction engine manufacturers
Milton Reeves

References

External links

Defunct companies based in Indiana
Companies established in 1875
Historic American Engineering Record in Indiana
Tractor manufacturers of the United States